Levin Mete Öztunalı (born 15 March 1996) is a German professional footballer who plays as a midfielder for Bundesliga club Union Berlin.

Following seven years in the academy of Hamburger SV, Öztunalı made his senior debut with Bayer Leverkusen in 2013. He made 15 league appearances for the club before joining Werder Bremen on a season-and-a-half loan deal two years later. Following the expiration of the loan in 2016, Öztunalı joined current club Mainz.

He has also represented Germany at various youth levels and was part of the squads which won the UEFA European Under-19 Championship in 2014 and UEFA European Under-21 Championship in 2017. He gained 30 caps and scored 7 goals until 2019.

Club career

Bayer Leverkusen

On 2 February 2013, Bayer Leverkusen announced the signing of Öztunalı from Bundesliga rivals Hamburg on a five-year deal, with the transfer to be completed at the end of the season. He made his debut on 10 August, coming on as a late substitute for Gonzalo Castro in a 3–1 win over Freiburg. At 17 years and 146 days Öztunalı became the youngest player to ever play for Leverkusen in the Bundesliga, and the 11th youngest player in the history of the competition. On 26 August 2014, Öztunalı was voted the second best u-18 player in Germany behind teammate Julian Brandt, in doing so he was awarded the silver Fritz Walter Medal.

Loan spell at Werder Bremen
On 21 December 2014, Öztunalı joined Werder Bremen on an 18-month loan deal, running until the end of the 2015–16 campaign. Upon his arrival in Bremen, Chief Executive Thomas Eichin described Öztunalı as "one of the most sought-after talents in the Bundesliga." His first goal for Die Grün-Weißen came on the final day of the 2014–15 season when he netted in a 3–2 loss to Borussia Dortmund. Öztunalı had to wait until May the following the season to score his next goal for the club, netting one and assisting another in a 6–2 drubbing of Stuttgart. The result saw Bremen climb out of the relegation zone at the expense of their opponents. He made his final appearance for the club on 14 May, playing for 77 minutes as Bremen beat Eintracht Frankfurt 1–0 to avoid relegation.

On 2 June 2016, amid speculation that Öztunalı would remain at Werder Bremen, Bayer Leverkusen director of football Rudi Völler confirmed that he would be returning to Leverkusen and would be part of the squad for the following season. Öztunalı amassed a total of 46 appearances across all competitions during his 18-month spell with Werder Bremen.

Mainz 05
On 25 August 2016, Leverkusen's Bundesliga rivals Mainz 05 announced the signing of Öztunalı on a five-year deal. He made his debut against Borussia Dortmund on 27 August, coming on as a second half-substitute for Suat Serdar, and scored his first goal for the club in the following match-week in a 4–4 draw with Hoffenheim. He scored his first ever European goal on 29 September, netting the winner in a 3–2 UEFA Europa League victory over Azerbaijani side, Qabala. He ultimately made 36 appearances in the season across all competitions, including 23 starts and five goals in the league as Mainz narrowly avoided the relegation play-offs.

International career
He has represented various German youth teams, however, as he is not capped at senior international level, he is eligible to represent for Germany or Turkey.

German national youth teams

Öztunalı has represented Germany at various youth levels since his debut for the U15 side in 2010. In 2014, he was part of the squad which took part in the UEFA European Under-19 Championship in Hungary. He scored the third goal in a semi-final victory over Austria and started in the final as Germany claimed the title with a 1–0 win over Portugal. His form throughout the competition saw him named in the Team of the Tournament alongside top scorer Davie Selke and four other countrymen.

In 2017, Öztunalı was one of 23 players selected in Stefan Kuntz's squad for the 2017 UEFA European Under-21 Championship in Poland. Germany were ultimately crowned champions, beating Spain 1–0 in the final to claim the title.

Personal life
Öztunalı is the grandson of former German international football legend and World Cup finalist Uwe Seeler. His father is Turkish and previously served as a scout for Hamburger SV.

Career statistics

Honours
Germany U19
UEFA European Under-19 Championship: 2014

Germany U21
UEFA European Under-21 Championship: 2017

Individual
UEFA European Under-19 Championship Team of the Tournament: 2014
 Fritz Walter Medal U18 Silver: 2014

References

External links

1996 births
Living people
Footballers from Hamburg
German people of Turkish descent
German footballers
Association football midfielders
Germany youth international footballers
Germany under-21 international footballers
Bayer 04 Leverkusen players
Bayer 04 Leverkusen II players
SV Werder Bremen players
1. FSV Mainz 05 players
1. FC Union Berlin players
Bundesliga players